Pimnitchakun Bumrungkit (born November 5, 1995), better known by her nickname Maengmum, is a Thai-Chinese actress, model and singer from the company TV Thunder.

Biography 
Maengmum was born in Samut Prakan, Thailand. She is the second child of the family and she has one older sister named Maengpor and one younger brother named Ice. Her sister gave birth to a son February 22, 2018, making Maengmum an aunt to Little Vampire. Maengmum is 163 cm tall, weighs 45 kg and her zodiac sign is Scorpio.

Education & Personal life 
She studied in Poonpokphol Kindergarten in Samut Prakan, graduated Elementary school from Praditsueksa in Chantaburi, attended Kasem Phithaya Junior High School in Bangkok, went to Adventist Ekamai Senior High school in Bangkok and she graduated from Bangkok University March 17, 2019, where she majored in Airline Business Management since 2014.

At first she planned to study film in Silpakorn University, because it matched her work. But then she decided to study airline business management in Bangkok University's tourism department because it's very interesting and she can learn English there.

On September 2nd, 2019 Maengmum changed her name on social media, now known as Tanshi. Later on Facebook she explained that "Tanshi" is a name that her mother gave her.

Career

2008–2014: Early career 
Maengmum entered the entertainment industry by becoming a TV show host for "" in 2008. She quit being a TV show host in 2010, and started appearing more on TV series and movies. One of her first dramas was "" ), where she played the supporting character Tit on August 16, 2010. In 2011 she also appeared on its sequel "" where she reprised her role as Tit. After those series, she continued to appear on smaller, less known dramas; "Khwam Hwang Sudthai" as Smorn in 2012, "Luk Mai Lai Lai Khon" as Thiporn (Nuwi) in 2012–2013 and "Hlung Tham Ha Chon" as Po in 2013–2014.

She made her film debut in 2012 in the film called "" as a character named Sa, and later appeared in another movie in 2014 titled "" as Hmuy.

2016–2018: Rising popularity 
On January 6, 2016, she appeared on a drama called "" playing another supporting character called Mali. Then, she finally had her first major drama role in "Bad Romance" where she played the sassy main character Yihwa alongside Tomo Visava Thaiyanont who played Yihwa's love interest, Cho. The series aired from July 18, 2016 to September 5, and it was a great success and garnered positive citations not just in Thailand, but also in specific communities in the Philippines, Vietnam, Cambodia, Japan, and Singapore.

In 2017, Maengmum also appeared in the prequel for "Bad Romance" titled "Together With Me" as Yihwa again, acting alongside co-stars Max Nattapol Diloknawarit and  who played Korn and Knock, Yihwa's two best friends. This series was very popular too, which gave Maengmum and the other actors in the series a lot of recognition, allowing for them to give multiple interviews and attending fan meetings such as "Together With Me in Chengdu", "Altogether in Manila" and "Together With Me Warm Up Party in Krabi".

In early 2018, "Together With Me The Next Chapter" was announced, the sequel to "Together With Me", where Maengmum would once again reprise her iconic role as Yihwa alongside her old cast. It has been announced that the series would first air September 28, 2018. On September 28, 2018 Maengmum along with the cast of "Together With Me The Next Chapter" held a fan meet event in Krabi, Thailand where they also premiered the 1st episode of the series.

Singing career 
October 3rd, 2018 Maengmum released her first official song titled "ยังไงก็เสียใจ (SORRY)" as the OST for Together With Me The Next Chapter. She sang it live for the first time in Thai TV show "Masterkey" on October 5, 2018. The song is available in Youtube, Spotify and other music apps. Before releasing an official song, she uploaded song covers in her own Youtube channel.

Filmography

Dramas

Films

TV shows

Various

Host 
  
 Beauty Caf'e
 Master key stage
 Z Z GENERATION
 Coke list (Scoop)

Music videos 
 ยิ่งดูยิ่งดี ศิลปิน ว่าน ธนกฤต (The more I look, the more good-looking you get)
 ไม่สำคัญอะไร ศิลปิน natural sense (Don't really matter)
 มีจริงหรือเปล่า ศิลปิน พินต้า (Does it really exist?)
 รักตัวเองก็พอ ศิลปิน พัดชา AF2 (Loving myself is enough)
 อกมีไว้หัก ศิลปิน เบิร์ด ธงไชย (Heart is for breaking)
 อาย ศิลปิน โปเตโต้ (Shy)
 ไม่รู้จะอธิบายยังไง ศิลปิน โปเตโต้ (Don't know how to explain)
 Who Cares ผิดที่เขา ศิลปิน หวาย (Who cares)
ถ้าหัวใจมีมือ - ASOG (ROCKCAMP by UP^G)
 เจ็บที่ยังรัก AROUND

References 

Living people
1995 births
Pimnitchakun Bumrungkit
Pimnitchakun Bumrungkit
Pimnitchakun Bumrungkit
Pimnitchakun Bumrungkit